Damian Siguenza, known by his stage name, Domino (born November 9, 1970), is an American record producer, manager, DJ, and one of the members of the Oakland, California-based underground hip hop collective, Hieroglyphics.

Biography
Born in San Francisco, California, Siguenza claimed in a 2006 interview that the nickname "Domino" came from his friends in high school:  

Domino began his music career as a rapper, but by 1989-90 had switched almost exclusively to beat making, following the purchase of a Casio FZ 10M sampler.  By the time he joined the Hieroglyphics in the mid-1990s, Domino concentrated solely on beat making and production.

Musical career

In 1991, Domino was living in the back room of 'The Groove Merchant' Record Store in the Bay Area honing his ear and craft with old and rare funk and soul records.  He met Hieroglyphics' founder Del the Funky Homosapien through a frequent customer, Elektra Records A&R/producer Dante Ross.  Del then introduced Domino to the other members of the Hieroglyphics, who admired Domino's beat making skills as much as Domino admired the Hieroglyphic's rapping skills, and Domino eventually became an integral part of the collective. Ultimately, as the various groups were signed to Elektra and Jive Records. Domino, being the oldest, became the spokesman and manager for most of the groups.

Domino is known for his combination of jazz and funk style sounds, creative sampling and extensive record knowledge. Some of his more notable tracks include "Let Em' Know and "Live and Let Live" from Souls of Mischief's first album 93 til Infinity. "After Dark" and "At The Helm" from the Hieroglyphics' first album 3rd Eye Vision and "Make Your Move" and "Powers That Be", from the Hieroglyphics' second album Full Circle.  His creative use of samples and approach to using funk and jazz-based music is one of the foundations of the Hieroglyphics' sound. His production has been featured on just about every Hiero-related release on Jive and Hieroglyphics Imperium labels.

In the years (1997–2006) of being acting CEO the Hiero Imperium, Domino has gained worldwide recognition and respect in the underground hip-hop world while expanding the Hiero Imperium to include artists such as O.C., Goapele, and Beeda Weeda.

Domino continues creating music for Commercials, Television and Video games. His songs have recently been featured in the EA's Tony Hawk's Pro Skater series and his songs featured on the HBO Entourage Series.

Domino has recently been associated with Dan the Automator and Amp Fiddler.  He is working on many new projects, including a solo project and Bay Area rapper Richie Cunning.

Production Discography
 1998 - 3rd Eye Vision - Hieroglyphics
 1993 - No Need for Alarm - Del the Funky Homosapien

Studio albums

Compilation albums

External links

References

1970 births
Living people
DJs from San Francisco
Record producers from California
Hieroglyphics (group) members
Businesspeople from San Francisco
Rappers from the San Francisco Bay Area
Hip hop musicians from San Francisco
21st-century American rappers